Bucida is a genus of flowering plants in the Indian almond family, Combretaceae. It contains the following species (but this list may be incomplete):
 Bucida angustifolia 
 Bucida buceras L. - Bullet tree (southern Mexico, Central America, the Caribbean, the Bahamas)
 Bucida comintana 
 Bucida correlliana 
 Bucida eocenica 
 Bucida macrostachya 
 Bucida macrostachys 
 Bucida megaphylla 
 Bucida megapotamica 
 Bucida molinetii (M.Gómez) Alwan & Stace - Spiny black olive (southern Florida in the United States, the Bahamas, Cuba, Hispaniola) 
 Bucida nariniana 
 Bucida nitida 
 Bucida ophiticola Bisse (Cuba)
 Bucida palustris Borhidi & O.Muñiz
 Bucida paramicola 
 Bucida sanchezensis 
 Bucida subinermis 
 Bucida umbellata 
 Bucida wigginsiana 

 
Myrtales genera
Taxonomy articles created by Polbot